The transverse humeral ligament (Brodie's ligament) forms a broad band bridging the lesser and greater tubercle of the humerus.  Its attachments are limited superior to the epiphysial line. By enclosing the canal of the bicipital groove (intertubercular groove), it functions to hold the long head of the biceps tendon within the bicipital groove.

References

Ligaments of the upper limb